Wargan is a locality in Victoria, Australia, located approximately 26 km from Mildura, Victoria.

References

Towns in Victoria (Australia)
Mallee (Victoria)